Njobvu is a surname of Zambian origin. Notable people with the surname include:

Rhoda Njobvu (born 1994), Zambian sprinter
William Njobvu (born 1987), Zambian football midfielder

Zambian surnames